Sherod Santos (born September 9, 1948 in Greenville, South Carolina) is an American poet, essayist, translator and playwright. His newest  poetry collection, Square Inch Hours (W.W. Norton) was published in 2017. His work has appeared in The New Yorker, The Paris Review, The Nation, Poetry, The Royal Court Theatre, Proscenium Theatre Journal, American Poetry Review, and The New York Times Book Review. His plays have been produced at the Algonquin Theatre in New York City, The Side Project in Chicago, the Brooklyn International Theatre Festival, and the Flint Michigan Play Festival. He wrote the settings for the Sappho poems in the CD Magus Insipiens, composed by Paul Sanchez and sung by soprano Kayleen Sanchez.

His many honors and awards include an Academy Award for Literary Excellence from the American Academy of Arts & Letters, a Guggenheim Fellowship, The Umhoefer Prize for Achievement in the Humanities, a National Endowment for the Arts Grant, the Theodore Roethke Memorial Prize. He was a finalist for The New Yorker Book Award in Poetry as well as The National Book Critics Circle Award and The National Book Award. From 1990 to 1998 he served as external examiner and poet-in-residence at the Poets' House outside Belfast, Northern Ireland.

He lives in Chicago, Illinois, where he works in an outreach program for the homeless.

Honors and awards
 2006 Umhoefer Prize for Achievement in the Humanities for Greek Lyric Poetry: A New Translation
 2002 Theodore Roethke Poetry Prize for The Pilot Star Elegies
 2001 National Book Critics Circle Award for Criticism Finalist for A Poetry of Two Minds
 2000 National Book Award Finalist
 1999 Academy Award for Literary Excellence from the American Academy of Arts & Letters
 1999 The New Yorker Book Award in Poetry Finalist
 1998 Bernard F. Connors Prize for Poetry from the Paris Review for "Elegy for My Sister"
 1987 National Endowment for the Arts fellowship
 1995 British Arts Council International Travel Grant
 1984 The Robert Frost Place poet in residence in Franconia, New Hampshire
 1983 Delmore Schwartz Memorial Award
 1983 Guggenheim Fellowship
 1982 Ingram Merrill Foundation fellowship
 1981 Oscar Blumenthal Prize from Poetry magazine
 1980 Pushcart Prize in both poetry and the essay
 1978 "Discovery"/The Nation Award

Published works
Full-Length Poetry Collections

 Square Inch Hours. W. W. Norton & Company. 2017, 
 
 
 
 
 The Southern Reaches. Wesleyan University Press. 1989.
 Accidental Weather. Doubleday & Company, Inc. 1982.

Essay Collections
 

Translations
 Greek Lyric Poetry: A New Translation. W. W. Norton & Company. 2005 

"Plays"
 Follow the Leader. Produced at The Side Project, Chicago, IL, 2016.
 Lives of the Pigeons. Produced at The Side Project, Chicago, IL, 2013
 Star. Produced at Algonquin Theatre, New York City, 2010
 Coffee Shop. Produced as part of Flint Michigan Play Festival, 2010

References

External links
 Audio: Sherod Santos reads Variation on a Theme (I) from The Intricated Soul
 Poems: Slate Magazine > May 6, 2008 > A Place in Maine by Sherod Santos
 
 Poem: Poetry Foundation > from Elegy for My Sister by Sherod Santos
 Poem: Valpariso Poetry Review > A Writer's Life by Sherod Santos

1948 births
Living people
American male poets
San Diego State University alumni
University of California, Irvine alumni
University of Utah alumni
University of Missouri faculty
Writers from Greenville, South Carolina
Poets from South Carolina
People from Missouri
Poets from Missouri
The New Yorker people
National Endowment for the Arts Fellows
American essayists
American male essayists